Injuwarampur is a village in Kanpur Dehat district in the state of Uttar Pradesh, India.

It is located in Derapur tehsil and near to Rura town at a distance of 7 kilometres.  Post office, primary school and upper primary school are here in government sector.

Transport
Ambiyapur is a nearest railway station of the village at a distance 2 km west-north. It falls on the Agra-Kanpur Railway Route North Central Railway zone. Rura Railway Station (9 km) is the nearest railway station to east and to the west Jhinjhak is at a distance of 10 km. Kanpur Central railway station is the nearest major Railway station.
Available Trains
64162 Shikohabad-Kanpur Pass
51810 Tundla-Kanpur Pass
64156 Tundla -Kanpur Pass
64158 Kanpur-Tundla Pass
51809 Kanpur-Tundla Pass
64159 Kanpur-Shikohabad Pass
It is connected with link road to Bhatauli-Rura town, Rura city, Derapur town, Kanpur  via Akbarpur and to the Golden Quadrilateral National Highway of India.

Nearest town
Rura is  7 km east, Bhatauli-Rura is 7 km east, Jhinjhak 13 km west, and Derapur is south at a distance of 15 km.

Administration
The village administrated by  Pradhan who is an elected representative of village as per constitution of India and Panchayati Raj India.

List of Gram Pradhan

 Ram Khelawan Mishra (1952---)
 Manni Singh Gaur
 Raja Ram Trivedi
 Indra Pal Singh Gaur
 Dulare Lal Savita
 Harpal Singh Kushwah
 Gyan Wati
 Vimla Devi
 Rajesh Singh Gaur
 BriJ Mohan Trivedi
 Geeta Devi (2015---2020) 
 Ram Gopal Trivedi(from March 25, 2021 to till date)

Festivals
All national festivals, Holi, Diwali, Mahashivratri, Shri Krishna Janmashtami, Ramnavami, Makara Sankranti, Eid-ul-Fitr, Rakshabandhan, Hanuman jayanti and other local ones such as Nag-Panchmi, Navratri, Durga Puja are celebrated with enthusiasm.

Visiting places

 Shiv Temple: It is about 200 years old and is constructed by renowned katyayan gotriya Mishra  family. Shiv Ling is main grave image at center of temple on a platform and adjacent is sitting Nandi. Ganesh, Parwati and Kartikey are placed on walls chambers. Main festival is celebrated on Maha Shivratri.
 Hanuman temple: under Peepal tree. This temple is made 25 years ago but graved image is about 200 years old. 
 Hardol ka mandir: This temple is special type temple and is rare for its quality. Every new married spouse first goes to this temple for blessings. It is situated near upper primary school towards south of township.

Demographics
As of 2001 India census, Injuwarampur had a population of 1221. Males constitute 51% of the population and females 49%.

Geography

Station name: Ambiyapur, Station code: APP

Gallery

References 

Villages in Kanpur Dehat district